Milikowice  is a village in the urban-rural Gmina Jaworzyna Śląska, within Świdnica County, Lower Silesian Voivodeship, in south-western Poland.

The early Gothic Parish Church of St. Michael the Archangel was built in the village in the mid-13th century and rebuilt in the 15th century.

References

Villages in Świdnica County